Essi Laine (born 27 July 1984) is a retired Finnish tennis player.

Laine won two doubles titles on the International Tennis Federation (ITF) tour in her career, both in 2004. On 11 April 2005, she peaked at world number 444 in the doubles rankings. Her doubles partner was, Emma Laine, her younger sister. On 8 September 2003, she reached her best singles ranking of world number 939.

Representing Finland at the Fed Cup, Laine has a win–loss record of 9–15.

Essi Laine retired from tennis 2008.

Personal life
Laine was born in Lahti, Finland. Her mother, Erika, was a Finnish Championship swimmer and her late father, Erkki Laine, was a professional ice hockey player who won a silver medal 1988 Calgary Olympics with the Finnish national team. Her younger sister, Emma, played tennis professionally until 2019.

ITF Doubles Circuit finals: 3 (2–1)

References

External links 
 
 
 

1984 births
Living people
Sportspeople from Lahti
Finnish female tennis players
20th-century Finnish women
21st-century Finnish women